Górki  (formerly German Gurkow) is a village in the administrative district of Gmina Zwierzyn, within Strzelce-Drezdenko County, Lubusz Voivodeship, in western Poland.

The village has a population of 980.

References

Villages in Strzelce-Drezdenko County